Šaravai (formerly) is a village in Kėdainiai district municipality, in Kaunas County, in central Lithuania. According to the 2011 census, the village had a population of 25 people. There are wooden Catholic church of Jesus Heart (built in 1933), burial place of the January Uprising victims. The Šaravai Oak Tree (a nature monument) is located nearby Šaravai village.

History
There was the Šaravai manor once. During the January Uprising insurgents used to gather under the Šaravai Oak Tree where they attended to the Mass. Once they there surrounded by Tsarist soldiers and many of them were killed. Conversely to most of Kaunas-Kėdainiai region (known as the Liauda) Šaravai was not polonized at the end of the 19th century.

Demography

Images

References

Villages in Kaunas County
Kėdainiai District Municipality